The streak-chested antpitta or spectacled antpitta (Hylopezus perspicillatus) is a species of bird in the family Grallariidae.
It is found in Colombia, Costa Rica, Ecuador, Honduras, Nicaragua, and Panama.
Its natural habitat is subtropical or tropical moist lowland forest.

References

Further reading

streak-chested antpitta
Birds of Costa Rica
Birds of Honduras
Birds of Nicaragua
Birds of Panama
Birds of Colombia
Birds of Ecuador
streak-chested antpitta
Taxonomy articles created by Polbot